Max Fraser is a Canadian filmmaker whose work focuses on Yukon and World War II remembrance topics.

Filmography

References 

Living people
Year of birth missing (living people)
Place of birth missing (living people)
Canadian documentary film directors
Studio 58 people
Film directors from Yukon